The  Bihar Legislature (IAST: Bihar Vidhan Mandal) is the supreme legislative body of the state of Bihar. It is a bicameral legislature composed of the Governor of Bihar and two houses: the Bihar Vidhan Parishad (Bihar Legislative Council) and the Bihar Vidhan Sabha (Bihar Legislative Assembly). The governor in his role as head of the legislature has full powers to summon and prorogue either house of legislature or to dissolve the Vidhan Sabha. The governor can exercise these powers only upon the advice of the Chief minister  and his ministry. 

Those elected or nominated (by the governor) to either house of legislature are referred to as Member of the Legislative Assembly (India) (MLAs). The Member of the Legislative Assembly are directly elected by the Bihari public voting in single-member districts and the Member of the Legislative Assembly (Vidhan parishad) are elected by the members of all panchayat, teachers, graduates and local governing body by proportional representation. The Legislature  has a sanctioned strength of 243 in the Vidhan Sabha and 75 in the Vidhan Parishad including 12 nominees from the expertise of different fields of literature, art, science, and social service. The Parliament meets at Bihar Vidhan mandal in Patna .

References

 
Bicameral legislatures
Legislature
State legislatures of India